Strozzi Palace may refer to:

 Palais Strozzi in Vienna, Austria
 Palazzo Strozzi in Florence, Italy